Kavbiuro was an organisation set up by the Bolsheviks in April 1920 as the regional organ of the Russian Communist Party (Bolshevik) in the Caucasus.

Kavbiuro was set up on 8 April 1920 under the leadership of the Georgian Grigory Ordzhonikidze (Chairman) and the Russian Sergey Kirov (Vice Chairman). One immediate concern was that Kavbiuro did not want to see any independent communist parties being created outside of their control.

Karabagh
One decision the Kavbiuro was involved in concerned Karabagh, a predominantly Armenian area disputed by both Armenia and Azerbaijan. Under Tsarist rule the area had been administered from Baku. However in the context of the ethnic conflicts following the Russian Revolution the Karabagh Armenians wanted to become annexed by Armenia. This was prevented first through the intervention of the Ottoman Empire, and following its collapse, by the British. Originally the Azerbaijan Soviet Socialist Republic, established in April 1920 promised that Karabagh would become part of Armenia. This position was endorsed by Kavbiuro on 3 July 1920, only to be reversed two days later "considering the necessity of national harmony between Muslims and Armenians, the economic linkage between upper and lower Karabagh, and its permanent ties to Azerbaijan."  Some Armenian historians have attributed this to the intervention of Stalin and Nariman Narimanov, chairman of Azrevkom, the Azerbaijani Revolutionary Committee. This position was maintained despite protests from the Armenian Communist Party. Aleksandr Myasnikyan described the Kavbiuro meeting:
"the last session of the Kavbiuro can be characterized as if Aharonian, Topchubashov  and Chkhenkeli were sitting there. Azerbaijan declared that if Armenia demanded Karabagh, then we will not give them kerosene."

References

Bodies of the Communist Party of the Soviet Union
History of the Caucasus under the Soviet Union
Organizations established in 1920
Organizations disestablished in 1922